Thomas Mayne may refer to:

 Thomas Mayne (politician) (1832–1915), Member of Parliament (MP) for Mid Tipperary, 1885–1890
 Thomas Mayne (inventor) (1901–1995), Australian industrial chemist, inventor of the Nestlé drink Milo
Thomas Mayne, MP for Newcastle-under-Lyme

See also 

Thom Mayne (born 1944), American architect
Thomas Mayne Reid (1818–1883), Irish-American novelist